Şəkərbəy (also, Shekerbey and Shekerbeyli) is a village and municipality in the Gadabay Rayon of Azerbaijan.  It has a population of 3,012.  The municipality consists of the villages of Şəkərbəy, Heydərli, Sarıhəsənli, Gödəkdərə, Qasımağalı, Əmiraslanlı, and Yaqublu.

References 

Populated places in Gadabay District